Bussin may refer to:

Bussin, former name until 1945 of Buszyno, now a village in the administrative district of Gmina Polanów, within Koszalin County, West Pomeranian Voivodeship
Sandra Bussin a politician in Toronto, Ontario, Canada
"Bussin" (song), a 2022 song by Nicki Minaj and Lil Baby
"Bussin'", song by Trouble
"Bussin", song by Blueface from his EP Dirt Bag
"Bussin Bussin", song by Lil Tecca from the F9 soundtrack